Alain Villiard (born 25 May 1965) is a Canadian former alpine skier who competed in the 1988 Winter Olympics.

References

1965 births
Living people
Canadian male alpine skiers
Olympic alpine skiers of Canada
Alpine skiers at the 1988 Winter Olympics